Wells Dam is a hydroelectric embankment dam located on the Columbia River, downstream from the confluence of the Okanogan River, Methow River, and the Columbia River in Washington state. The dam, associated structures, and machinery make up the Wells Hydroelectric Project. It is owned and operated by Douglas County Public Utility District.

It has produced electricity since August 22, 1967. Its operating license from the US Federal Energy Regulatory Commission is next up for renewal in 2052. The Wells project has ten generating units rated at a combined 840 megawatts. In addition to the Douglas County and Okanogan County public utility districts, the project provides electricity to Puget Sound Energy, Portland General Electric, PacifiCorp, Avista Corporation, and the Confederated Tribes of the Colville Reservation.

Its reservoir is named Lake Pateros. Just below and adjacent is Carpenter Island boat launch and fish hatchery river access. Lake Pateros is not deep but a high volume of water moves through it. Thus, low-head, high-volume Kaplan turbine runners drive generation.

See also

List of dams in the Columbia River watershed

References

Buildings and structures in Chelan County, Washington
Dams on the Columbia River
Dams in Washington (state)
Buildings and structures in Douglas County, Washington
Hydroelectric power plants in Washington (state)
United States local public utility dams
Dams completed in 1967
Energy infrastructure completed in 1967
Gravity dams
1967 establishments in Washington (state)